Eric Alexander Orie (born January 25, 1968 in Utrecht) is a Dutch football manager.

Career
Orie played 129 games in his professional career and scored 11 goals in Austria, Italy and the Netherlands.

Honours

Manager

FC Vaduz
Liechtenstein Football Cup (2): 2010, 2011

Individual
Liechtensteiner Coach of the Year (1): 2010

References

External links

1968 births
Living people
Dutch footballers
Dutch football managers
Expatriate footballers in Italy
SKN St. Pölten players
Footballers from Utrecht (city)
VVV-Venlo players
Dutch expatriate sportspeople in Austria
Serie A players
Association football midfielders
Dutch expatriate sportspeople in England
A.C. Reggiana 1919 players
Expatriate footballers in Austria
Blackpool F.C. players
Dutch expatriate sportspeople in Italy
FK Austria Wien players
FC Admira Wacker Mödling players
FC Lustenau players
Expatriate footballers in England
Expatriate football managers in Austria
Expatriate football managers in Liechtenstein
FC Vaduz managers
USV Elinkwijk players
Dutch expatriate football managers